Anellus is a monotypic moth genus of the family Erebidae. Its only species, Anellus edai, is known from Ishigaki Island, which is southwest of Japan. Both the genus and the species were first described by Michael Fibiger in 2008.

Adults have been found in March and August. There are probably several generations per year.

The wingspan is 7–9 mm. The forewing is short and broad, with a bright, ovoid, yellow reniform stigma. The crosslines are all present. The antemedial, postmedial and terminal lines are prominent, black and slightly waved. The terminal line is marked by tight black interveinal spots. The hindwing is blackish brown, without a discal spot. The underside of the upper forewing is part brownish and otherwise light brown, without a pattern. The underside of the hindwing is greyish brown, with a discal spot and a postmedian line.

References

Micronoctuini
Noctuoidea genera
Monotypic moth genera